Kurt Rolf Grönholm (16 December 1926 – 1 May 2017) was a Finnish rower. He competed in the men's coxed four event at the 1952 Summer Olympics.

References

External links
 

1926 births
2017 deaths
Finnish male rowers
Olympic rowers of Finland
Rowers at the 1952 Summer Olympics
Sportspeople from Uusimaa